{{DISPLAYTITLE:C5H8O2}}
The molecular formula C5H8O2 may refer to:

 Acetylacetone
 Acetylpropionyl
 Allyl acetate
 Angelic acid
 Coffee furanone
 Cyclobutanecarboxylic acid
 Ethyl acrylate
 Glutaraldehyde
 Isopropenyl acetate
 Methyl methacrylate
 Tiglic acid
 Valerolactones
 δ-Valerolactone
 γ-Valerolactone
 Vinyl propionate